Scattergood Survives a Murder is a 1942 American mystery film directed by Christy Cabanne from a screenplay by Michael L. Simmons, based on the series of short stories about "Scattergood Baines", penned by Clarence Budington Kelland.

Cast
Guy Kibbee as Scattergood Baines
John Archer as Dunker Gilson
Margaret Hayes as Gail Barclay
Wallace Ford as Wally Collins
Spencer Charters as Sheriff
Eily Malyon as Mrs. Grimes
John Miljan as Rolfe
George Chandler  as Sam Caldwell
Dick Elliott as Mathew Quentin
Florence Lake as Phoebe Quentin
Sarah Edwards as Selma Quentin
Willie Best as Hipp
George Guhl as Deputy
Eddy Waller as Lafe Allen
Margaret Seddon as Cynthia Quentin
Margaret McWade as Lydia Quentin
Frank Reicher as Thaddeus Quentin
Earle Hodgins as Coroner

Production
In July 1942 it was announced that Guy Kibbee would star in the picture, to be produced by Jerrold T. Brandt, who had produced the earlier 4 Scattergood films.

References

External links

1942 films
American black-and-white films
Films directed by Christy Cabanne
American comedy mystery films
1940s comedy mystery films
1942 comedy films
Films scored by Paul Sawtell
RKO Pictures films
1940s English-language films
1940s American films